László Éger (born 7 May 1977) is a Hungarian football centre back. He currently plays for Paksi SE and Hungary national team and also played for Debreceni VSC. On 16 May 2007, Éger terminated his contract with Poli Ejido and returned to Paksi SE.

References

External links

Profile at HLSZ 

1977 births
Living people
People from Paks
Hungarian footballers
Association football fullbacks
Hungary under-21 international footballers
Hungary international footballers
Paksi FC players
Szekszárdi UFC footballers
Dunaújváros FC players
Debreceni VSC players
Polideportivo Ejido footballers
Nemzeti Bajnokság I players
Segunda División players
Hungarian expatriate footballers
Expatriate footballers in Spain
Hungarian expatriate sportspeople in Spain
Sportspeople from Tolna County